José Francisco "Kikin" Fonseca Guzmán (born 2 October 1979) is a Mexican former professional footballer who played as a striker. He currently works as a football analyst for Televisa Deportes Network.

Club career
Born in León, Guanajuato, Fonseca made his first division debut with La Piedad in the 2001 Invierno season. After two seasons with Piedad, in which he played mostly as a substitute, Fonseca moved to UNAM Pumas, where he emerged as a star. After impressive showing in the 2003 Apertura and Clausura, he cemented his place in the Pumas starting lineup in the 2004 Clausura, during which he helped lead UNAM to a championship. After helping Pumas to a second title in the 2004 Apertura season, he was transferred to Cruz Azul, having registered 25 goals in 81 appearances for Pumas. At the beginning of 2005, Fonseca moved to Cruz Azul in one of the biggest transfers in Mexican league history. In Cruz Azul, he also was an important player playing 60 and registering 2 goals, help Cruz Azul reach the quarterfinals.

Benfica
On 27 July 2006, Fonseca signed a four-year contract with Portuguese club S.L. Benfica. Playing in only eight league games and scoring one goal (he also played in three cup games scoring two goals). His first goal at S.L. Benfica was on 21 December 2006 when he headed in a pass from Nuno Gomes against Belenenses.
Kikin scored another two goals in a match of the 4th round of the Taça de Portugal between Oliveira do Bairro SC and Benfica that ended 5–0.

After a half season with Benfica, he was transferred to Mexico's UANL Tigres for the start of the Clausura 2007.

International career
Fonseca was an emerging force at forward for the senior national team. On 2 April 2006, coach Ricardo Lavolpe selected him in the 23 man Mexican squad for the 2006 World Cup, in Germany. He scored his first goal in the 2006 FIFA World Cup against Portugal and won the Man Of The Match Award given by FIFA in the defeat of Mexico versus Portugal. After being selected by Hugo Sánchez for the 2007 Gold Cup, Fonseca was dropped from the squad for the 2007 Copa America due to his low performances and being shown the yellow card two consecutive games for un-called for fouls and complaints against refs. Despite an injury to star striker Jared Borgetti, Fonseca declined invitation to the 2007 Copa America. Even though he was Hugo's first choice, he took Luis Angel Landin instead. On 7 August 2008, Fonseca was called up to join Ericksson's second list of players, after an almost 1 and a half year drought of not playing with the national team. He earned a total of 43 caps, scoring 21 goals.

Career statistics

International

International goals

Honours
La Piedad
Liga de Ascenso: Verano 2001

UNAM
Mexican Primera División: Clausura 2004, Apertura 2004
Campeón de Campeones: 2004

Tigres UANL
North American SuperLiga: 2009

Individual
Mexican Primera División Forward of the Tournament: Clausura 2006

References

External links
 
 
 
 
 
 
 Kikin Fonseca's career timeline and detailed statistics

1979 births
Living people
Sportspeople from León, Guanajuato
Footballers from Guanajuato
Association football forwards
Association football wingers
Mexican footballers
Mexico international footballers
2005 FIFA Confederations Cup players
2006 FIFA World Cup players
2007 CONCACAF Gold Cup players
La Piedad footballers
Club Universidad Nacional footballers
Cruz Azul footballers
S.L. Benfica footballers
Tigres UANL footballers
Atlante F.C. footballers
Santos de Guápiles footballers
Liga MX players
Mexican expatriate footballers
Expatriate footballers in Portugal
Mexican expatriate sportspeople in Portugal
Expatriate footballers in Costa Rica
Mexican expatriate sportspeople in Costa Rica